The Return of the Durutti Column is the debut studio album by English band The Durutti Column. It was released in January 1980, through record label Factory.

Background 

The initial two thousand copies also included a flexi-disc single with two tracks by producer Martin Hannett: "First Aspect of the Same Thing" and "Second Aspect of the Same Thing".

The original 3600 LP sleeves were made of coarse sandpaper (similar to the Situationist book Mémoires), designed to scratch LPs which were placed on either side of it. The sleeves were assembled by members of the bands and label-mates Joy Division and A Certain Ratio. A regular printed sleeve for later copies was designed by Steve Horsfall. Some later pressings featured a sixth untitled track on side two. The damaging to adjacent LPs led to the album frequently being placed separated from the rest, which may have been the idea for the cover.

"Sketch for Summer"/"Sketch for Winter" was released as a single (Gap Records SFA-491) in Australia, with a sleeve by Andrew Penhallow of Gap.

In 2013 a modified version was issued as a vinyl album by Factory Benelux (FBN-114) with an 11-inch square sheet of coarse glasspaper attached to the inner sleeve, visible through a die-cut in the front cover. The die-cut was based on the 1978 Factory 'bar graph' logo designed by Peter Saville. On this edition, the Hannett tracks were included on a bonus 7-inch single on hard vinyl.

The album was given the Factory Identifier FACT14 (Vinyl), or FACT14-C (Cassette).

Legacy 

AllMusic called the album a "quietly stunning debut, as influential down the road as his labelmates in Joy Division's effort with Unknown Pleasures."

Track listing 

All tracks written by Vini Reilly

Side A
 "Sketch for Summer" - 2:58
 "Requiem for a Father" - 5:06
 "Katharine" - 5:26
 "Conduct" - 4:59

Side B
 "Beginning" - 1:37
 "Jazz" - 1:35
 "Sketch for Winter" - 2:22
 "Collette" - 2:20
 "In 'D'" - 2:25

Bonus flexi-disc

 "First Aspect of the Same Thing" - 3:42
 "Second Aspect of the Same Thing" - 2:59

Personnel 

 The Durutti Column

 Vini Reilly – guitar
 Pete Crooks – bass guitar
 Toby Toman (credited as Toby) – drums

 Additional personnel

 Martin Hannett – production
 Chris Nagle – engineering
 John Brierley – engineering
 Anthony H. Wilson – sleeve artwork (uncredited)

References

External links 

 

1980 debut albums
The Durutti Column albums
Albums produced by Martin Hannett
Factory Records albums